The murder of William Butler was an early example of a school shooting in Louisville, Kentucky in 1853.

Background
William Butler was a 28 year old teacher, a Yankee from Indiana who came to Louisville and founded the Louisville School, attracting pupils from the wealthy families.  As a teacher he was strict about discipline. He was 28 years old, married and was a father. He had been a tutor to the Ward family for twenty months before travelling in Europe to develop his language skills for teaching. His right hand had been crippled by a burn and he could neither close it or write with it. He was a member of the Unitarian church.

William Ward was the 15 year old son of a prominent merchant and land speculator. He had brothers Matthews F. and Bob.

Matthews Floury Ward was 27 years old and married but had no children. He had attended Harvard and published two books on his travels in Europe, the Middle East and England. He was William's oldest brother.

Robert Jnr was a 19 year old brother of the above.

Robert Snr was part owner of a lucrative New Orleans firm. He was known for gambling and had a riverboat named after him. His wife Emily (née Floury) was of Huguenot descent. The family owned nine slaves.

Events

Confrontation
On 1 November 1853 William Ward brought chestnuts into the classroom, contrary to school rules. He brought them in during a five minute recess before Butler's French class and handed the nuts to other boys during the class. Butler noticed the shells after class and asked who had eaten them. Ward admitted bringing them in, said he had distributed them before class and denied eating any during class. Butler punished one student for eating during class, but did not punish a second because he was new and didn't know the rule against eating. Butler accused Ward of eating chestnuts in class, which the latter denied. Butler accused him of being a liar and administered a whipping, which was not unusual in the 19th Century. Ward took his hat and left the school after punishment.

His parents and Robert Jnr were out of town that evening so he told Matthews what happened.

Shooting
On 2 November Mr and Mrs Ward and Robert Jnr returned around 9am. Matthews told his father that he was going to the school to see Butler about what happened, his father offered to go. At the trial Robert Snr testified that Matthews insisted on going to force Butler to offer "in the presence of the school, the apology that a gentleman ought to make".

Matthews Ward had earlier that morning bought a couple of pistols. His mother insisted that Robert Jnr, who was known to carry a Bowie knife accompany him, but knew nothing of the pistols. This was because of a previous confrontation with another teacher.

About 9:30am, a Ward family slave arrived at the school to collect schoolbooks and escort their fourth brother Victor home.

Around 10am, the other three brothers arrived at the school. Unaware of the anger of Matthews Ward, he greeted them in a friendly manner. Matthews called him a "damned scoundrel" and a "coward", he and Butler then fought. During the struggle, Matthews Ward pulled out his pistol and shot Butler. Robert took out his knife and waved it at the boys and the other teacher. The brothers left, though Robert returned briefly to retrieve the murder weapon.

Students attempted to help Butler to his home, though he was so ill that they could not bring him that far and brought him to a relative and called a doctor. Butler died early on the morning of 3 November 1853.

The sheriff arrested both Matthews and Roberts Jnr.

Butler had been a popular teacher and his death at the hands of the son of a wealthy man outraged many in Louisville.

Attorneys for the Wards sought a change of venue from Jefferson County to Hardin County. In February 1854 the two brothers were moved to the jail in Hardin County. The behaviour of Louisville newspapers was one reason given.

The case was covered in newspapers across the United States.

Trial
The trial began in April 1854.

The prosecution had four attorneys and the defence eighteen, including John J. Crittenden.

Selection of the jury was controversial, with 64 men summoned before 12 men were selected.

The judge instructed the jury to find Matt guilty or not guilty of manslaughter, not mentioning conviction of murder as an option. Robert Jnr was tried as an accomplice.

Matt came to the court on crutches, suffering from a rheumatic condition, though he didn't use them at the time of the shooting.

Prosecution witnesses included thirteen of the forty boys that were present at the shooting. They said that Matt was never in danger of being injured by Butler. None saw Butler strike Matt. They suggested that he may have raised his arm to deflect a movement by Matt or to push him out the door. They agreed that Matt kept his right hand in his coat pocket until he pulled a pistol from said pocket. One had picked up tongs to use against Robert Jnr if he needed to.

The defence attempted to discredit their testimony. Crittenden even suggested that Sturgis, the other teacher, had manipulated their testimony since the shooting. The defence insisted that the account of Robert Jnr was the only reliable account. Robert had claimed that Butler had hit Matt just before the latter shot him. Character witnesses for the defence included James Guthrie. One defence witness was a carpenter named Barlow claimed he had aided the doctor who had treated Butler, but the doctor disagreed. Barlow claimed that Butler had admitted to striking Matt before the latter shot him in order to prove self defence. Prosecution witnesses claimed that Barlow had gone unasked to Mr. Ward and offered to testify that Butler had struck Matt. Barlow said under cross-examination that the Wards had not paid him.

On 26 April 1854 Matt was acquitted, as was Robert.

That evening a crowd gathered outside the Ward mansion, which was empty. Some threw stones, breaking glass in the conservatory. Some burned effigies of the two brothers and threw them on the porch, causing it to catch fire. A fire company managed to extinguish the blaze, which did minor damage to the front of the house.

The trial also came at a time of changing views about guns in the United States. Outside of the South many states prohibited public carrying of firearms, but in Kentucky in particular judges had rejected most forms of regulation of guns as infringing the right to bear arms.

The trial attracted more attention than the murder.

The verdict was condemned across the United States, particularly outside the South. Abolitionists particularly condemned the South as having a particularly violent natures with its laws donimated by "the pistol and the lash". "An Act that would have hung him in Massachusetts, is justified in Kentucky." wrote one newspaper.

References

Deaths by person in Kentucky
1853 in Kentucky
Male murder victims
Murder in Kentucky
School shootings in the United States
1853 murders in the United States